Events from the year 1732 in Sweden

Incumbents
 Monarch – Frederick I

Events

 12 May to 10 October - Carl Linnaeus performs the Expedition to Lapland. 
 26 September – Peace treaty between Sweden and Poland. 
 December – The paper Then Swänska Argus begin its publication.
 - The first Swedish East Indiaman is sent by the newly established Swedish East India Company to China.

Births

 6 September - Johan Carl Wilcke, physicist  (died 1796) 
 18 November - Pehr Hilleström, painter (died 1816) 
 - Maria Christina Bruhn, inventor (died 1802) 
 - Hedvig Catharina De la Gardie, courtier (died 1800)

Deaths

 - Lars Ulstadius, pietist  (born 1650)
 Jonas Lambert-Wenman, pirate (born 1665)

References

 
Years of the 18th century in Sweden
Sweden